The Vesper Country Club, founded in 1899, is located on the Merrimack River in Tyngsborough, Massachusetts.  According to the USGA, and Golf Magazine, its golf course is one of the first in the United States, and was home to the first Massachusetts Open in 1905, won by golfer and course designer Donald Ross.

History

The Vesper Country Club is the merger of the Vesper Boat Club, founded in 1875, and the Lowell Country Club, founded in 1892.

In the 1880s, Wickasee Island (former home of Chief Wannalancit who left in 1686), now known as Tyngs Island in the Merrimack River, was a favorite recreation spot for the area.  People would gather for outings and picnics, as well as an amusement park was built, but in 1887 a fire destroyed most of the buildings. A few years later, in 1893, the Lowell Country Club purchased Tyngs Island in the Merrimack River for $7,123.00, and built the original club house.  The following year, 1894, a 1/3 mile oval bicycle track was installed, circling two baseball fields, and that is when the two clubs, the Vesper Boat Club, and the Lowell Country Club voted to merge.

In 1895, the island was developed with six links golf course as the game of golf became popular.  Just two years later, golf became the club's main attraction, as the course expanded to 9 holes.

The two clubs officially became the Vesper Country Club in 1899.

In 1903, Vesper became a charter member of the Massachusetts Golf Association, and in 1905 as the new clubhouse was complete, the first Massachusetts Open  was held at Vesper, won by Donald Ross.

In 1908, the 550 ft long, steel cable, suspension foot bridge was installed.

In 1914 Ross returned as a course designer, and the golf course was expanded to have 18 holes, with the other 9 being on the mainland.

In 1923, the Clubhouse burned to the ground, but was rebuilt by the next year.

The Great Flood of 1936 destroyed most of Vesper, as the Merrimack river overflowed its banks, but the club rebuilt, despite losing 50% of its membership.

In the late 1990s into the early 2000s, Vesper underwent another major renovation of its golf course.

In 2008, the membership voted to completely rebuild all 18 greens to USGA specifications and to restore the bunkers on the course.  The rebuilding of the greens and the restoration of the bunkers was overseen by architect Brian Silva, Golf Course Superintendent Chris Morris and Assistant Golf Course Superintendents Chris Hans and Christopher Orlich.  The restoration attempted to be faithful to the original design and plans of Donald Ross.  This rebuilding project was completed at the end of 2009.

In the March 10, 2011 issue of Golf Week magazine, Vesper's golf course was ranked as one of the top 100 classic golf courses in the U.S.

The course record for Vesper is 62 shot by a professional. (Score Card Is In Paul Boland`s Desk)

Facilities
 Private 18 hole championship golf course. The  par-72 course stretches over 6,700 yards from the back tees. There are five sets of tees. Black, Blue, White, Green, and Red.
 Club house with formal dining
 Two swimming pools
 Four tennis courts

Events hosted
2019 Massachusetts Open
2005 Massachusetts Open
1979 Massachusetts State Amateur Championship
1963 Massachusetts State Amateur Championship
1951 Massachusetts State Amateur Championship
1905 Massachusetts Open

References

1899 establishments in Massachusetts
Golf clubs and courses in Massachusetts
Sports venues in Middlesex County, Massachusetts
Sports venues completed in 1899
Tyngsborough, Massachusetts